Karl Oscar Ragnar Malm (14 May 1893 – 1 March 1959) was a Swedish road racing cyclist. He competed at the 1912, 1920 and 1924 Summer Olympics and won a team gold, silver and bronze medal, respectively. His best individual result was seventh place in 1920. Nationally he won the road time trial 10 times, individually (1912, 1917–18 and 1920–1922) and with a team (1913, 1918–1920).

References

External links

profile

1893 births
1959 deaths
Swedish male cyclists
Cyclists at the 1912 Summer Olympics
Cyclists at the 1920 Summer Olympics
Cyclists at the 1924 Summer Olympics
Olympic cyclists of Sweden
Olympic gold medalists for Sweden
Olympic silver medalists for Sweden
Olympic bronze medalists for Sweden
Olympic medalists in cycling
Sportspeople from Stockholm
Medalists at the 1912 Summer Olympics
Medalists at the 1920 Summer Olympics
Medalists at the 1924 Summer Olympics
19th-century Swedish people
20th-century Swedish people